The following lists events that happened during 1970 in the Grand Duchy of Luxembourg.

Incumbents

Events

January – March
 1 January - Value added tax (TVA) is introduced at 8%, with a reduced rate of 4%.
 4 March – Cargolux is founded.
 21 March – Representing Luxembourg, David Alexandre Winter finishes twelfth (and last) in the Eurovision Song Contest 1970 with the song Je Suis Tombé Du Ciel.  It is the first and (so far) only occasion on which Luxembourg has scored 'nul points'.

April – June
 20 May - Luxembourg and Portugal sign a treaty governing the growing population of Portuguese Luxembourgers.
 28 May - Luxembourg and Yugoslavia sign a treaty governing the migration of Yugoslavs to Luxembourg.

July – September

October – December
 11 November - Alfred Loesch is appointed to the Council of State.
 2 December – One of Cargolux's two CL-44's crashes in East Pakistan while conducting a humanitarian airlift, killing four crew members and four villagers.
 9 December - Legislation sets the workweek at 40 hours.

Births
 16 August - Patrick Santer, politician

Deaths
 8 April – Felix of Bourbon-Parma, prince consort

Footnotes

References